Secret Servant: The Moneypenny Diaries is the second in a trilogy of novels chronicling the life of Miss Moneypenny, M's personal secretary in Ian Fleming's James Bond series. The diaries are penned by Samantha Weinberg under the pseudonym Kate Westbrook, who is depicted as the book's "editor." Published by John Murray publishers, Secret Servant was released on November 2, 2006, in the UK following the first instalment, subtitled Guardian Angel that was released in 2005. No North American release has been announced as of October 2008.

Plot introduction
From saving spies to private passions, this book covers the secret adventures of James Bond's right-hand woman. Jane Moneypenny may project a cool, calm and collected image but her secret diaries reveal a rather different story. In the grip of an uncertain love affair and haunted by a dark family secret, the last thing she needs is a crisis at work. But the Secret Intelligence Service is in chaos. One senior officer is on trial for treason, another has defected to Moscow and her beloved James Bond has been brainwashed by the KGB. Only a woman's touch can save them. Moneypenny soon finds herself embroiled in a highly charged adventure infused with the glamour of the Cold War espionage game. Alone on a dangerous Russian mission she turns, with breathless intimacy, to writing a truly explosive private diary.

Production
 In order to write the book Weinberg met up with ex Secret Service agents and even traveled to Moscow to meet Kim Philby's widow.

See also
 Outline of James Bond

References

External links
 Ian Fleming Publications official website
 Secret Servant review - The Young Bond Dossier
 Samantha Weinberg Secret Servant interview - MI6
 The Samantha Weinberg CBn Interview

2006 British novels
James Bond books
Novels by Samantha Weinberg
John Murray (publishing house) books